Never Mind 2017 was a professional wrestling event promoted by DDT Pro-Wrestling (DDT). It took place on December 24, 2017, in Tokyo, Japan, at the Korakuen Hall. The event aired domestically on Fighting TV Samurai. It was the seventeenth event in the Never Mind series.

Production

Background
Since 2001, DDT began producing their year-end shows under the branch of "Never Mind". The events' traditional venue was initially the Korakuen Hall, but during the years, the promotion moved the events to other arenas. These events conclude certain feuds and rivalries built during the year. Beginning with 2017 and until 2021, the "Never Mind" series were briefly replaced by the DDT Ultimate Party as the promotion's year-closing events.

Storylines
The event featured ten professional wrestling matches that resulted from scripted storylines, where wrestlers portrayed villains, heroes, or less distinguishable characters in the scripted events that built tension and culminated in a wrestling match or series of matches.

Event
Three titles were disputed but only two of them changed hands during the pay-per-view. The Ironman Heavymetalweight Championship was the first to do so, parting between Miyu Yamashita, Kazuki Hirata and Diego. KO-D Tag Team Champions Naomichi Marufuji and Harashima defended successfully against Daisuke Sasaki and Tetsuya Endo, and in the main event, Konosuke Takeshita defeated Colt Cabana to retain the KO-D Openweight Championship, securing his tenth consecutive defense of the title.

Results

References

External links
The official DDT Pro-Wrestling website

DDT Pro-Wrestling shows
2017 in professional wrestling
December 2017 events in Japan
Professional wrestling in Tokyo